Nebularia incompta (common name: tessellate mitre) is a species of sea snail, a marine gastropod mollusc in the family Mitridae, the miters or miter snails.

Description
The shell size varies between 44 mm and 160 mm

Distribution
This species is distributed in the Red Sea and in the Indian Ocean along Tanzania and the Mascarene Basin; in the Indo-Pacific Region

References

 Spry, J.F. (1961). The sea shells of Dar es Salaam: Gastropods. Tanganyika Notes and Records 56
 Cernohorsky W. O. (1976). The Mitrinae of the World. Indo-Pacific Mollusca 3(17) page(s): 323
 Drivas, J. & M. Jay (1988). Coquillages de La Réunion et de l'île Maurice

External links
 Gastropods.com : Mitra (Mitra) incompta; accessed : 11 December 2010

incompta
Gastropods described in 1786